Rana Muhammad Arif Iqbal Harnah is a Pakistani politician who had been a member of the Provincial Assembly of the Punjab from August 2018 till January 2023.

Political career

He was elected to the Provincial Assembly of the Punjab as a candidate of the Pakistan Muslim League (N) from Constituency PP-35 (Sialkot-I) in the 2018 Pakistani general election.

References

Living people
Punjab MPAs 2018–2023
Pakistan Muslim League (N) MPAs (Punjab)
Year of birth missing (living people)